Little Chicago is an unincorporated community in Spartanburg County, in the U.S. state of South Carolina.

History
The community had once had a reputation for illicit liquor manufacturing and sales, earning it the moniker Little Chicago.

References

Unincorporated communities in Spartanburg County, South Carolina
Unincorporated communities in South Carolina